Major is a military rank.

Major, majors or The Major may also refer to:

 Academic major, an academic discipline to which an undergraduate student formally commits
 Major and minor in music, an interval, chord, scale, or key

Arts and entertainment

Fictional characters
 The Major (Hellsing)
 Major, a horse in Disney's Cinderella
 Major Gowen or the Major, in Fawlty Towers
 Motoko Kusanagi or the Major, in Ghost in the Shell
 The Major, a character in Daniel Suarez' novels Daemon and Freedom™

Film, television, theatre and literature
 The Major, a 1963 BBC natural history documentary film
 The Major (film), a 2013 Russian action film
 Major (film), a 2022 Indian biopic
 Major (manga), a sports manga and anime series by Takuya Mitsuda 
 The Major (play), an 1881 American musical comedy
 "The Major" (The Blacklist), a 2015 episode of The Blacklist
 Major!, a 2015 documentary about Miss Major Griffin-Gracy

Music
 Majors (band), a Danish hip-hop group
 The Majors (band), an American R&B group
 Major (American musician) (born 1984), American pop soul musician and actor	
 Major, nickname of Klaus Heuser (born 1957), German rock guitarist and producer
 Major, a method of change ringing for eight church bells

People
 Major (given name), including people with the nickname
 Major (surname), including the surname Majors
 Major (law), a person with the full legal rights of an adult

Places
 Major, Kentucky, U.S.
 Major, Saskatchewan, Canada
 Maieru or Major, Romania
 Lake Major, Nova Scotia, Canada
 Mount Major, New Hampshire, U.S.

Science, technology and transportation
 Major (cider apple)
 Major (Dutch Elm) Ulmus × hollandica 'Major', a Dutch Elm cultivar
 Major (fly), a genus of flies
 Morris Major, an Australian car model 1958–1964
 Morris Major (1931 to 1933), a British automobile 
 Major, an American tactical missile developed by Redstone Arsenal

Sports
 Grand Slam (tennis), also known as the tennis majors
 Major professional sports leagues in the United States and Canada or majors
 Major Players, a professional wrestling tag team
 Men's major golf championships, often referred to simply as the majors
 Senior major golf championships
 Women's major golf championships
 Senior women's major golf championships

Other uses
 Major film studio, often known collectively as the majors
 Major suit or major in contract bridge, namely hearts and spades
 Major's, an American chain of department stores 
 Major, a Carroll's cigarette brand
 Major (Joe Biden's dog), German shepherd owned by Joe Biden
 Major (Franklin D. Roosevelt's dog), German shepherd owned by Franklin D. Roosevelt

See also
 
 
 A. major (disambiguation)
 C. major (disambiguation)
 Maior (disambiguation)
 Majority (disambiguation)
 Major Major Major Major, a character in Catch-22
 Major Minor (disambiguation)
 Old Major, a character in Animal Farm